Roller skate is a shoe or binding mounted on wheels.

It may also refer to

 "Roller Skate" (Natasha Bedingfield song)
 "Roller Skate" (Sheryl Crow song)
 "Roller Skate" (Vaughan Mason & Crew song)
 "Brand New Key", also known as "The Roller Skate song"

See also 
 Rollerskates (Malcolm in the Middle episode)